Asterostemma is a genus of flowering plants belonging to the family Apocynaceae.

Its native range is Jawa.

Species:

Asterostemma repandum

References

Apocynaceae
Apocynaceae genera
Taxa named by Joseph Decaisne